An emergency physician (often called an "ER doctor" in the United States) is a physician who works at an emergency department to care for ill patients. The emergency physician is a specialist in advanced cardiac life support (advanced life support in Europe), resuscitation, trauma care such as fractures and soft tissue injuries, and management of other life-threatening situations.

In some European countries (e.g. Germany, Belgium, Poland, Austria, Denmark and Sweden), emergency physicians/anaesthetists are also part of the emergency medical service and are dispatched together with emergency medical technicians and paramedics in cases of potentially life-threatening situations for patients (heart attacks, serious accidents, resuscitations or unconsciousness, strokes, drug overdoses, etc.). In the United States, emergency physicians are mostly hospital-based, but also work on air ambulances and mobile intensive-care units. 

When a patient is brought into the emergency department, they are usually sent to triage first. The patient may be triaged by an emergency physician, a paramedic, or a nurse; in the United States, triage is usually performed by a registered nurse. If the patient is admitted to the hospital, another physician such as a cardiologist or neurologist takes over from the emergency physician.

Training in the United States 
The standard training route of emergency physicians in the United States is 4 years of college, four years of an approved medical school, and then a three or four year residency in emergency medicine.After completion of residency it is common for American emergency physician's to work in a hospital's emergency department and take the board certification necessary to become certified in emergency medicine. This includes a 300+ question written exam followed by an oral exam.

Role in healthcare 
Emergency physicians in the United States typically work in Emergency Departments. Patient's come in for a variety of reasons from severe life threatening complaints such as strokes and heart attacks to potentially life threatening complaints like severe abdominal pain and to less severe complaints such as mild injuries. The emergency physician is expected to oversee their care, rule out life threatening diseases, stabilize the patient if necessary, and decide if the patient needs to be admitted to the hospital for further care or discharged home to follow up as an outpatient. Emergency physicians work with a large amount of other professionals, including physician assistants/nurse practitioners, registered nurses, pharmacists, respiratory therapists, medical techs, medical scribes, and more. For more information on what the practice of an emergency physician looks like, see emergency medicine.

Fellowship
Some additional training paths after becoming an emergency physician include:
Toxicology
Wilderness medicine
Emergency ultrasound
Trauma and or critical care
Sports medicine
Pediatric emergency medicine
Medical education
International emergency medicine
Hyperbaric and undersea medicine
Emergency medical services (EMS) and disaster medicine

These training paths are recognized by the American Academy of Emergency Medicine and are anywhere from 1-2 years in length.

See also
 Ambulance
 American College of Osteopathic Emergency Physicians
 Emergency department
 Emergency medical services
 Emergency medicine
 Fellow of American College of Emergency Physicians - professional certification for emergency physicians
 Primary care physician

References

External links
 American College of Osteopathic Emergency Physicians
 American Osteopathic Board of Emergency Physicians
 Canadian Association of Emergency Physicians

Emergency medicine
Emergency physicians